Paul Pimsleur (October 17, 1927 – June 22, 1976) was a French-American linguist and scholar in the field of applied linguistics. He developed the Pimsleur language learning system, which, along with his many publications, had a significant effect upon theories of language learning and teaching. Pimsleur Language Programs is an American language learning company that develops and publishes courses based on the Pimsleur Method.

Early life and education 
Paul M. Pimsleur was born in New York City and grew up in The Bronx. His father, Solomon Pimsleur, was a Jewish immigrant from France and a composer of music; his American-born mother, Miera, was a librarian at Columbia University. Pimsleur earned a bachelor's degree at the City College of New York, and from Columbia University he earned a master's degree in psychological statistics and a PhD in French.
Before settling down he had many adventures throughout Europe and the United States with his best friend Marcel Alter and remained friends with him and his family for the rest of his life.

Career 
His first position involved teaching French phonetics and phonemics at the University of California, Los Angeles. After leaving UCLA, Pimsleur went on to faculty positions at the Ohio State University, where he taught French and foreign language education. At the time, the foreign language education program at OSU was the major doctoral program in that field in the U.S. While at Ohio State he created and directed the Listening Center, one of the largest language laboratories in the United States. The center was developed in conjunction with Ohio Bell Telephone and allowed self-paced language study using a series of automated tapes and prompts that were delivered over the telephone.

Later, Pimsleur was a professor of education and Romance languages at The State University of New York at Albany, where he held dual professorships in education and French. He was a Fulbright lecturer at the Ruprecht Karls University of Heidelberg in 1968 and 1969 and a founding member of the American Council on the Teaching of Foreign Languages (ACTFL). He did research on the psychology of language learning and in 1969 was section head of psychology of second languages learning at the International Congress of Applied Linguistics.

His research focused on understanding the language acquisition process, especially the learning process of children, who speak a language without knowing its formal structure. The term "organic learning" was applied to that phenomenon. For this, he studied the learning process of groups made of children, adults, and multilingual adults. The result of this research was the Pimsleur Language Programs. His many books and articles affected theories of language learning and teaching.

In the period from 1958 to 1966, Pimsleur reviewed previously published studies regarding linguistic and psychological factors involved in language learning. He also conducted several studies with support from Ohio State or from the US Office of Education. This led to the publication in 1963 of a coauthored monograph, Underachievement in Foreign Language Learning, which was published  in the International Review of Applied Linguistics.

Through this research, he identified three factors that could be used to calculate language learning aptitude: verbal intelligence, auditory ability, and motivation. Pimsleur was the primary author of the Pimsleur Language Aptitude Battery (PLAB) based on these three factors to assess language aptitude. He concluded that low auditory ability was a major factor in underachievement.  Pimsleur was one of the first foreign language educators to show an interest in students who have difficulty in learning a foreign language while doing well in other subjects. Today, the PLAB is used to determine foreign language-learning aptitude, or even a foreign language-learning disability, among secondary-school students.

Death 
Pimsleur died unexpectedly of a heart attack during a visit to France in 1976.

Legacy 
Since its creation in 1977, The ACTFL-MLJ Paul Pimsleur Award for Research in Foreign Language Education, which is awarded annually, bears his name.

Pimsleur's business partner, Charles Heinle, continued to develop the Pimsleur courses until he sold the company to Simon & Schuster Audio in 1997.

In 2006, Pimsleur's daughter, Julia Pimsleur, created the Entertainment Immersion Method® inspired by the Pimsleur Method, which is the foundation of the Little Pim language teaching program for young children, sold in the U.S. and 22 countries.

In 2013, Simon & Schuster reissued Dr. Paul Pimsleur's out-of-print book How to Learn a Foreign Language in hardcover and eBook format to celebrate the 50th anniversary of Paul Pimsleur's first course.

Selected works 
 Pimsleur, Paul; Quinn, Terence (editors). The psychology of second language learning: papers from the Second International Congress of Applied Linguistics, Cambridge, 8–12 September 1969. London, Cambridge University Press, 1971. 
 Poems make pictures; pictures make poems. Poems by Giose Rimanelli and Paul Pimsleur. New York : Pantheon Books. 1972. 
 Pimsleur, Paul. Encounters; a basic reader. [simplified by] Paul Pimsleur [and] Donald Berger. New York, Harcourt Brace Jovanovich. 1974. 
 Pimsleur, Paul. How to learn a foreign language. Boston, Mass. : Heinle & Heinle Publishers, 1980.

References

Further reading 
 Hommage à Paul Pimsleur / mise en œuvre, Robert Galisson. Paris : Didier, 1977. (French)
 How To Learn a Language, Carl J. Beuke, PhD. Brief article summarising some of the points from Paul Pimsleur's (now republished by Simon & Schuster https://web.archive.org/web/20140503034017/http://pages.pimsleur.com/pimsleur-book) book "How To Learn a Foreign Language". Psychology Today, 2012.

1927 births
1976 deaths
Linguists from the United States
City College of New York alumni
Columbia Graduate School of Arts and Sciences alumni
Ohio State University faculty
University at Albany, SUNY faculty
University of California, Los Angeles faculty
Educators from New York City
Language teachers
20th-century linguists
American people of French descent
American expatriates in France
Fulbright alumni